FEB may refer to:
 February, as an abbreviation for the second month of the year in the Gregorian calendar
 Brazilian Expeditionary Force
 Federal Executive Boards, in the US
 Federation of Enterprises in Belgium
 Spanish Basketball Federation
 Federatie Eredivisie Basketball, which runs the Dutch Basketball League
 FeB, chemical formula for iron boride